Gary Ross is an American film director, producer, and writer.

Gary Ross may also refer to:
 Gary Ross (baseball), American baseball player
 Gary Ross (ice hockey), American ice hockey player
 Gary N. Ross, American energy economist